Edwin Henry Mason Smith (1886-1971) was a watchmaker and jeweller.

Biography

Smith was born at 6 Constantine Street, in Plymouth, Devonshire on 20 July 1886. His father Edwin Henry Smith was a Jeweller Journeyman. He grew up living above a watch and jewellery shop in Embankment Road, Plymouth. He was the eldest son of five boys and was known as Eddie or Ed in England and as Ted or Henry in New Zealand.

Immigration to New Zealand
He spent his 21st birthday in hospital with rheumatic fever and after a doctor told him the climate in England was not suitable to his medical condition and after marrying Ada Garrett in Plymouth on 3 July 1909 he emigrated to New Zealand. Arriving in Wellington he travelled to Auckland by train on the newly completed North Island main trunk line. After working for Adolf Cohen who owned a watch and jewellery shop in Queen Street, Auckland he moved to Huntly where he opened up in business at 1 Main Street. Watch Maker and Jewellers shop in the front and accommodation in the back.

May Smith and Henry met in Huntly. May's father Alexander Smith had worked in the mines in Consett, North England as a stonemason, moved to New Zealand and worked in the coal mines in Huntly so that he could pay the passage for his wife and four daughters to join him in New Zealand (Alexander Smith built the stone chair on the walkway between Thorne and Milford Beaches, Northshore, Auckland).

Sidney Smith (Sid) was born on 18 August 1917.

WWI military service
Henry enlisted for the 1st New Zealand Expeditionary Force, 29th Reinforcements on 20 February 1917 in Hamilton and was given Regimental Number 54711. He was subsequently marched into the Featherston training camp and during training was posted to the 30th Wellington Reinforcements, Specialist Company – Machine Gun Sqron on the on 3 June 1917. Private Edwin Smith embarked on Troop Ship Number 93 from Wellington on 13 October 1917 and disembarked in Liverpool, England on 8 December. He was marched into Sling Camp at Larkhill, Bulford Village, Salisbury Plains on 9 December 1917.

In London on 13 June 1918, he was classified as unfit for duty and was transferred to APD on 26 December 1918. He was hospitalised due to influenza between 2 January and 22 February 1919. He embarked the SS Ionic in London on 14 March 1919 and arrived back in New Zealand on 24 April 1919. Due to a hernia, he was discharged from military service on 2 May 1919.

War medals and badges in recognition of service: Silver British War Medal, 1914–1918, Silver War Badge number NZ26776.

Back in New Zealand

Back in New Zealand Henry, May and Sid moved to a five-acre block of land in Mount Albert, Auckland. Around 1920 they purchased a recently completed house at 5 Arnold Street, Grey Lynn and opened a Watchmaker and Jewellery Shop at 314 Ponsonby Road near the Three Lamps.

Edwin (Ted) Smith was born on 17 September 1922 and Alexander (Alex) Smith was born on 5 April 1924.

During the 1930s the Great Depression came so the shop was closed as people did not have money for luxuries like jewellery. Henry started doing beaten copper work under the house in Arnold Road making; box curbs, fire screens and bellows. He made all his own designs and dyes and sold his works to The Farmers Trading Company in Hobson Street. During the hard times, Henry got labouring jobs hand mixing concrete on such places as The Civic Theatre in Auckland and the Chateau Tongariro.

Faith (Faye) Smith was born on 2 July 1930. Henry Smith at the age of 46 and May Smith got married at the Registers Office, Auckland on 15 August 1932.

When the economy got better Henry went back to the watch and jewellery trade, working from home or at Ripley's Manufacturing Jewellers in Queen Street, opposite the central Post Office. Maxwell (Max) Smith was born on 17 December 1934.

Edwin Henry Mason Smith died on in the Cornwell Public Hospital, Epsom, Auckland on 15 October 1971 at an age of 85 and was buried at Waikumete Cemetery on the 16th. He had lived in New Zealand for 62 years. At the time of his death, May Smith was 71.

The Voyager New Zealand Maritime Museum located on the Auckland waterfront has an exhibition called "The Immigrants". This exhibition relives the stories of immigrants to New Zealand from the 1950s through to the 1960s, as they leave their homes, families, and possession for a life on the other side of the world. In this exhibition, there are feature walls and artefact display cases showing the life of Edwin Henry Mason Smith – Jeweller and his family.

References

External links
 Voyager New Zealand Maritime Museum
 Archives New Zealand – SMITH, Edwin Henry Mason Smith – WW1 N.Z. Army – Regimental Number 54711. Archives Record Number 0106235

New Zealand people of World War I
New Zealand jewellers
1886 births
1971 deaths
Burials at Waikumete Cemetery